Pteridoporthis is a genus of moths belonging to the subfamily Tortricinae of the family Tortricidae. It contains only one species, Pteridoporthis euryloxa, which is found on Fiji.

See also
List of Tortricidae genera

References

External links
tortricidae.com

Archipini
Taxa named by Edward Meyrick
Monotypic moth genera
Moths described in 1937
Moths of Fiji
Tortricidae genera